Pokémon Stadium 2, known in Japan as  is a strategy video game developed by Nintendo EAD and published by Nintendo for the Nintendo 64. It features all 251 Pokémon from the first and second generations of the franchise. It was released in Japan on December 14, 2000, in North America on March 26, 2001, and in Europe on October 10, 2001. In Western regions it was titled Pokémon Stadium 2, as it was the second Stadium game to be released outside Japan, in which it was the third game in the series. It supports Dolby Surround sound.

Like its predecessor, Pokémon Stadium 2 is compatible with the Transfer Pak accessory, allowing players to use Pokémon trained in the three original Game Boy Pokémon games (Pokémon Red, Blue, and Yellow) and the three Game Boy Color games (Pokémon Gold, Silver, and Crystal). The majority of the game takes place inside the fictional White City, where various facilities for battling, organizing, researching, and playing with Pokémon are located. The Japanese edition also features the capability to use the Pokémon Mobile System from Pokémon Crystal. The game is set to be re-released on the Nintendo Switch Online + Expansion Pack in 2023.

Gameplay

Pokémon Stadium 2 does not have a storyline. Progress can be made by winning trophies in the Stadium, a tournament mode consisting of four "Cups", as well as completing the Gym Leader Castle, where the player earns badges by defeating Gyms specializing in different Pokémon types. When all Stadium trophies have been won and the Gym Leader Castle is completed, the player's rival will want to battle. Defeating the rival will unlock Round 2, in which the player must re-challenge the Stadium, Gym Leader Castle, and the Rival at a higher difficulty level.

Set in a new town called White City, the Stadium is home to the Poké Cup, Prime Cup, Challenge Cup, and Little Cup, each having its own rules and regulations. With the exception of the Challenge Cup, the player first assembles a team of six Pokémon consisting of any combination of rental Pokémon or imported Pokémon from a Game Boy cartridge. In the Challenge Cup, the parties of the player and opponents are chosen completely randomly. In the same fashion as the first Stadium, each combatant chooses only three of their six Pokémon to use in a battle before beginning.

In the Gym Leader Castle, the player is challenged to collect Gym badges by defeating trainers at the eight Johto League Gyms. Pokémon battles follow the same three-on-three format as in the Stadium, and either imported or rental Pokémon may be used to construct a team of six. Each Gym is known for using a specific type of Pokémon, but the Gym's trainers can have Pokémon of a different type for balance. The Elite Four can be battled after collecting all eight badges, and upon their defeat, a rival battle is unlocked. Defeating the rival unlocks the Kanto Gym Leaders and subsequently the Pokémon Champion Red.

Additional features
The Mini-Game Park is an area in White City where up to four players can play 12 different Pokémon-themed mini-games. Though not required, Pokémon from the players' inserted Game Boy cartridge can be used in certain mini-games.

Gutsy Golbat: As four Golbat, players fly around the cave collecting hearts that are blown by a Jynx, taking care not to bump into their opponents or Magnemite along the way.
Topsy-Turvy: As Hitmontop, players knock each other out of an arena using the Rapid Spin move. The player who gets five knockouts wins.
Clear Cut Challenge: As Scyther, Scizor, or Pinsir, players must cut the white line on their logs, with them either gaining or losing points depending on how their log was cut. The player who has the most points after five logs wins.
Furret's Frolic: As Furret, players knock the four Poké Balls into their corner to score. Alternatively, the player can also play as a Girafarig.
Barrier Ball: As Mr. Mime, players bounce a Poké Ball around into each other's court.
Pichu's Power Plant: As Pichu, players race to be the first to fully charge up using four electrodes. A Pikachu can be used in place of a Pichu.
Rampage Rollout: As Donphan, players compete to be the first to complete nine laps around a square track. Depending on their placement, players receive dust clouds they can use to stop their opponents from getting ahead. On the final lap, the Donphan use Rollout.
Streaming Stampede: Using either Cleffa or Igglybuff, players are tasked with counting a specific Pokémon and earn points based on how close they were to the estimate. On the fifth question, players must count every Pokémon.
Tumbling Togepi: As Togepi, players run on a treadmill to reach the goal, avoiding boulders, flowers, and Diglett along the way. An Omanyte can be used in place of a Togepi.
Delibird's Delivery: Players control Delibird and pick up presents to gain points, with them gaining more points if they deliver the same present multiple times.
Egg Emergency: Players control Chansey and must catch the falling eggs while avoiding Voltorb.
Eager Eevee: Four Eevee race around a lid held down by an Aipom, who will then open it to reveal fruit that players must grab while avoiding Pineco.

In Free Battle mode, players may conduct practice battles. Players can select rules from any of the tournament cups or use modified rules. Up to four players may participate, using any combination of rental Pokémon and those imported via the Transfer Pak. Pikachu can say its name when you choose the trainer icon from the Pokémon section screen.

At the Game Boy Tower, Pokémon Red, Blue, Yellow, Gold, Silver, and Crystal can be played on the Nintendo 64. Winning Stadium cups and completing the Gym Leader Castle eventually unlock higher speed options.

If connected to Pokémon Gold, Silver, or Crystal, the player can use the "Mystery Gift" function to receive a random item in the Game Boy game. These include decorations for the player's room, which can be viewed and customized in Stadium 2.

In Japan, through use of the mobile phone adapter bundled with copies of Crystal, the player could access a "Mobile Stadium" game mode in which the player battled other players downloaded from the mobile phone service in a tournament. It was also possible to play against friends through transferring the information across the mobile adapter.

The Nintendo 64 Expansion Pak increases the texture resolution and overall image quality when inserted into the console.

Development
The success of Japan's Pokémon Stadium 2, released internationally as Pokémon Stadium, led to the development of a third entry. Scheduled for a late 2000 release, the game was to be demonstrated publicly at the 2000 Nintendo Space World festival. By July 20, 2000, the game's title was changed from Pokemon Stadium 3 to Pokemon Stadium Gold/Silver. Nintendo announced more information on October 3, including the dates of the Japanese release and official tournaments. On October 25, Nintendo set the game's North American release date for March 26, 2001.

Reception

Pokémon Stadium 2 received favorable reviews from critics. While discussing the mixed quality of the Pokémon console games, Retronauts described it as "outstanding". IGN's Chris Carle rated the game 7.5 out of 10, but he acknowledged that the game would not appeal to people who had not played the Game Boy games, writing, "for someone who hasn't played Pokemon at all, this will seem like a huge waste of time. And it is. Unless you have something to use the Transfer Pak with, this game has zero appeal, because you have no emotional attachment to it." Pokémon Stadium 2 was a finalist for "11th Annual GamePro Readers' Choice Awards" for "Best Action Game of The Year", but lost to Grand Theft Auto III for PlayStation 2.

Notes

References

External links
 Official Nintendo Japan Pocket Monsters' Stadium Gōrudo Shirubā site
 The Official Pokémon Website

2000 video games
Games with Transfer Pak support
Multiplayer and single-player video games
Nintendo 64 games
Nintendo 64-only games
Nintendo Switch Online games
Party video games
Stadium 2
Turn-based strategy video games
Video game sequels
Video games developed in Japan

ja:ポケモンスタジアム#ポケモンスタジアム金銀